Emily Iris Robins (born 21 May 1989) is a New Zealand actress and singer. She was born to Danny Robins and Susan Robins. She is known for her role in the popular TV2 soap opera Shortland Street as Claire Simone Solomon (2004–2007), and for her role in the popular FOX 8 teen drama, SLiDE, where she portrayed Scarlett Carlyle. She was born in London, England but raised in New Zealand. She grew up in Orewa. She was involved with Centre Stage Theatre (an Orewa Theatre company).

She gained her place in Shortland Street by auditioning at high school, winning the part of Claire. She left the show in July 2007, when her character was found dead in a skip, by TK Samuels (Benjamin Mitchell) and Mark Weston (Tim Foley).

In 2007, she appeared in a stage performance of Arthur Miller's The Crucible, in Auckland, New Zealand, where she portrayed the character of Susannah.

In 2008 Robins was cast as the lead in the Australian children's television program The Elephant Princess, playing protagonist Alexandra Wilson. The show ran for two seasons. The Elephant Princess had its name changed to The Rock Princess in the United Kingdom. In 2011 she was cast as Scarlett Carlyle in the Australian teen drama series SLiDE.

Robins played the character of Toni in the 2016 TV2 drama series Filthy Rich''.

Filmography

Awards

References

External links
 TVNZ profile of Emily Robins
 
 
 Television New Zealand story on Emily Robins
 Emily Robins on Twitter
 Emily Robins Gallery

New Zealand television actresses
Living people
1989 births
21st-century New Zealand actresses
21st-century New Zealand women singers
New Zealand stage actresses
New Zealand soap opera actresses